Dharamkot (aka Dharmkot) is a small hill station in Kangra district  in the state of Himachal Pradesh, India.

On the crest of a hill above McLeodGanj, Dharamkot is a spot with wide views of the Kangra Valley and the Dhauladhar ranges. Dharamkot also has the Vipassana meditation centre, Dhamma Shikara, as well as the Tushita Meditation Centre which is a centre for the study and practice of Buddhism in the Tibetan Mahayana tradition.

Past Dharamkot, at a distance of 9 km from McLeodGanj, much of which is a steady climb, Triund is at the foot of the Dhauladhar ranges and is at a height of 2,827 m. The snow line is the most easily accessible in the entire Himalayan range starts from Ilaqua, 4 km from Triund.

Mini Israel 
               
Dharamkot is a locality known as 'Tel Aviv of hills'. It is the only village in the state with a Jewish community center – the Chabad house, which stands in the middle of the village and looks like 770 Eastern Parkway. Restaurants serve Israeli dishes : falafel, shakshuka and hummus with pita. Over time, locals have also acclimatised and many can now fluently speak Hebrew. Signage and boards in the village are also written in Hebrew, and keyboards in Internet cafes have Hebrew letters. Israeli people every year mark ceremonies here to celebrate Rosh-Hashana.

Triund 
The trek to Triund starts from Gallu Devi temple in Dharamkor, where people going for this trek register their names.

The trek mostly is a straight route up to Triund. The distance is 11 kilometers and usually takes about 4–5 hours.

Gallery

References

Villages in Kangra district
Hill stations in Himachal Pradesh
Dharamshala